Southern Tagalog (also known colloquially as Rehiyong Timog Tagalog), designated as Region IV, was an administrative region in the Philippines that comprised the current regions of Calabarzon and Mimaropa, the province of Aurora of Central Luzon (then part of Quezon Province until 1979), and several cities of Metro Manila (formerly part of Rizal, except for Valenzuela, which was part of Bulacan, and for Quezon City and Pasay which were and are independent cities). The name remains as a cultural-geographical region only, which exempts Aurora.

The region is bordered by Manila Bay and South China Sea to the west, Lamon Bay and the Bicol Region to the east, the Tayabas Bay, Sibuyan Sea, and Balabac Strait which is a maritime border with Sabah, Malaysia to the south, and Central Luzon to the north.

It was partitioned into the two regions on May 17, 2002.

History 
Southern Tagalog was the largest region in the Philippines in terms of both land area and population. The 2000 Census of Population and Housing showed the region having a total of 11,793,655 people, which comprised 15.42 percent of the 76.5 million population of the country at that time.

Quezon City was the designated regional center of Southern Tagalog.

The former region covered the area where many reside; the two other majority-Tagalophone regions are the National Capital Region and Central Luzon.

Partitioning 
Region IV or Southern Tagalog was divided into Calabarzon and Mimaropa, upon the issuance of Executive Order No. 103, dated May 17, 2002, by then-President Gloria Macapagal Arroyo. Additionally, the province of Aurora was moved to Region III (Central Luzon), the physical location of the province.

Administrative divisions

Provinces 

Camarines Norte and Camarines Sur, which are under Bicol Region, are sometimes considered part of Southern Tagalog recently, as there has been a language shift in recent years to Tagalog, which is more common native language, from being historically Bikol-speaking provinces.

Cities 
Southern Tagalog region had 13 chartered cities prior to its partition.

 Antipolo
 Bacoor
 Batangas City
 Calapan
 Calamba
 Cavite City
 Lipa
 Lucena
Pasig
 Puerto Princesa
Quezon City
 San Pablo
 Tagaytay
 Tanauan
 Trece Martires

Cities that were recently added after the partition (all of these are located in Southern Tagalog mainland or Calabarzon):

Biñan
Cabuyao
Calaca
Dasmariñas
General Trias
Imus
San Pedro
Santa Rosa
Santo Tomas
Tayabas

Demographics

Languages 

The native languages of Southern Tagalog are:
 Alangan, spoken in the interior of Mindoro.
 Asi, spoken in Romblon and Marinduque.
 Buhid, spoken in the interior of Mindoro.
 Calamian Tagbanwa, spoken in Palawan.
Chavacano, spoken in parts of Cavite.
 Cuyonon, spoken in Palawan.
 Hanunoo, spoken in the interior of Mindoro.
 Hiligaynon, spoken in Palawan.
 Iraya, spoken in the interior of Mindoro.
Malay, spoken in south Palawan.
Manide, spoken in Quezon.
Molbog, spoken in south Palawan.
 Onhan, spoken in Romblon.
 Palawano, spoken in Palawan.
 Romblomanon, spoken in Romblon.
 Tadyawan, spoken in the interior of Mindoro.
 Tagalog, spoken in Cavite, Laguna, Batangas, Rizal, Quezon, Occidental Mindoro, Oriental Mindoro, Marinduque, Romblon, and Palawan. It is the regional lingua franca, mostly as Filipino.
 Tausug, spoken in southwestern Palawan.
 Tawbuid, spoken in the interior of Mindoro.

The languages not native to the region are: Ilocano in Quezon, Laguna, Rizal, Cavite, Batangas, Mindoro, and Palawan (Aurora & Quezon have the largest concentration of Ilocano speakers when Aurora was part of Southern Tagalog, the statistics now excusively belong to Quezon); Bikol in Quezon, Batangas, Rizal, and Marinduque; Cebuano in Rizal, Batangas, Cavite, and Quezon; Kinaray-a in Palawan; Kapampangan and Pangasinan in Batangas and Cavite.

Notes

References 

Defunct regions of the Philippines
Tagalog
1965 establishments in the Philippines
2002 disestablishments in the Philippines
History of Calabarzon
History of Mimaropa